The men's 110 metres hurdles event at the 1983 Pan American Games was held in Caracas, Venezuela on 28 August.

Results
Wind: -3.2 m/s

References

Athletics at the 1983 Pan American Games
1983